At the Foot of the Ladder is a 1912 American silent short romantic comedy written by Lloyd Lonergan. The film starred Mignon Anderson, William Garwood, Carey L. Hastings, Harry Chamberlain, and Riley Chamberlain.

Cast
 Mignon Anderson as The Debutante
 William Garwood as The Society Leader
 Carey L. Hastings as The Debutante's Mother
 Riley Chamberlain as The Debutante's Father
 Harry Chamberlain as The Reporter

External links

1910s romantic comedy films
Thanhouser Company films
1912 films
American romantic comedy films
American silent short films
American black-and-white films
1912 short films
1912 comedy films
1910s American films
Silent romantic comedy films
Silent American comedy films